Start Hill is a hamlet on the B1256 road, in the Great Hallingbury civil parish, Uttlesford District, in the English county of Essex. It is near the town of Bishop's Stortford.

Singer Charli XCX grew up in Start Hill.

Location 
Start Hill is located on the B1256 road to the east of the town of Bishop's Stortford and junction 8 of the M11 motorway.  The A120 road passes to the north of Start Hill. It is about 3 miles away from London Stansted Airport and is the location of one of the National Express coach depots.

References 

 Essex A-Z (page 22)

Hamlets in Essex
Uttlesford